GT2827 Elizabeth is a steam powered combination bus that operates in the English seaside town of Weston-super-Mare, and previously in Whitby.

The vehicle was created in 2002, when a tourism transport operator, the Northern Star Motor Carriage Company, converted a 1931 Sentinel steam-powered DG6P flatbed lorry into a 30-seat bus. It is used to take people on a tour of the town, providing up to ten trips per day over the summer months. It is the only steam bus in revenue-earning service in the world and has become something of a tourist attraction in its own right. As of April 2015 it has been purchased by Crosville, a public and heritage bus operator in Weston-super-Mare.

It has two gears, chain transmission, six wheels and ten pneumatic tyres, and a body made from white ash and mahogany. It was a flatbed lorry and then a tar sprayer in its original commercial life, before being bought from a scrapyard for preservation in 1962.

Before the bus could carry fare-paying passengers, it had to undergo a 35° tilt test and required an amendment to legislation since the exhaust was not sited at the rear of the vehicle. In November 2011, it took part in London's Lord Mayor's Show. The journey from Whitby to London, via York, Leeds, Bradford, Burton upon Trent and Rugby was all by Elizabeth's own steam power.

Notes

References

External links 

 Whitby Steam Bus and Charabanc page

Steam buses
Steam road vehicles
Sentinel Waggon Works
Whitby
Individual buses
Vehicles introduced in 2002